Southside High School is the largest school in the Etowah County School System, serving 900 students in grades 9–12. The students come from the communities of Southside and Rainbow City. The school is housed in a building constructed in 2007. Their mascot is the panther, and their colors are maroon and black.

Southside High School has a 91% graduation rate. Its student population is 92.2% White, 3.6% Black, 2.2% Hispanic and 2.0% other.

Administration 
 Julie Tucker – Principal
 Shane Chappell – Assistant Principal
 Skylar Nelson – Assistant Principal

External links

References

Buildings and structures in Gadsden, Alabama
Public high schools in Alabama
Schools in Etowah County, Alabama